Elulu is listed as the third king of the First Dynasty of Ur on the Sumerian king list, which states he reigned for 25 years.

One early inscription for an "Elulu (or Elili), king of Ur" was found at nearby Eridu, stating that this king had built up the abzu ziggurat for Enki. 

Some scholars have further connected Elulu with the "Elilina" who was said to be the father of the later king Enshakushanna of Uruk, but this theory is uncertain, owing to chronological difficulties. The inscription states that Enshakushanna's father was "Elilina", possibly King Elulu of Ur:

References

See also

History of Sumer

Sumerian kings
26th-century BC Sumerian kings
First Dynasty of Ur